The Maimarkt-Turnier Mannheim is an annual international horse show held during the Mannheimer Maimarkt since 1964. The show jumping competitions take place in the MVV-Reitstadion and the dressage competitions take place in the MVV-Dressurstadion in Mannheim, Germany, belonging to the Maimarktgelände.

The horse show is organised by the Reiter-Verein Mannheim e.V.

The main show jumping competitions are usually designed as CSI 3* and the main dressage competitions as CDI 4* (until 2017 CDI 3*). A para dressage competition and an arena polo tournament are also part of the event.

References

Sports competitions in Mannheim
Equestrian sports in Germany
Show jumping events
Dressage events
Para Dressage
Polo in Germany